Empire of the Vampire is a 2021 illustrated horror-fantasy novel by Australian novelist Jay Kristoff.

Plot

Present 
Twenty-seven years after Daysdeath, a mysterious phenomenon that has cast the world into eternal darkness, vampires have successfully conquered humanity. Gabriel de Leon the last living vampire hunter, the Silversaints and a legend amongst their ranks, is held prisoner awaiting execution for killing the Forever King, Fabien Voss. However, the vampire empress orders Gabe to tell her historian his entire life before he is to be executed. He tells of his life as a Silversaint, his family, and his failure to save humanity.

Twenty Years Previous 
Gabe was born in the town of Larson in the kingdom of the Nordlands as the son of a blacksmith and a disinherited noblewoman. When he was fifteen, he bit a girl to drink her blood, which led the Silversaints to find him and reveal his true father was a vampire. He is recruited into the Order of San Michon and trained under veteran Silversaint Greyhands. He learns that there are four vampire bloodlines, and each has a unique ability called a bloodgift, but he has none making him a "frailblood." While on a hunt Gabe discovers his bloodgift is in fact sanquimancy, meaning his father was of the fifth vampire bloodline, believed to be extinct. This leads him to sneak into the forbidden section of the library to learn about his heritage where he meets Astrid Rennier, the bastard of the emperor exiled as a nun, and Chloe Sauvage who are researching what caused Daysdeath and how to end it. The three of them begin having secret meetings in the library to research both Daysdeath and the fifth bloodline, eventually learning only the Holy Grail can end Daysdeath and the fifth bloodline is both feared and hated by other vampires.  

Eventually, on a hunt they face off against Laure Voss, the Forever King's favorite daughter. She cripples Geyhands, but Gabe manages to wound her, save his fellow SIiversaints and intercept her message to her father. The Silversaints learn of the Forever King's planned invasion of the Nordlands, so they go to stop them, but Gabe is forced to stay behind due to disobedience. However, Gabe discovers secret writing in Laure's message learning that the vampires will just walk around the armies and invade. Gabe gathers all the nuns, monks, and blacksmiths in service to the Silversaints to stop the vampires. During the battle, Gabe learns Laure destroyed his village and killed his family, so Gabe destroys her and creates an avalanche destroying the approaching vampire army. For this Gabe is initiated into the Order and knighted by the empress. For the next five years Gabe lives to become the greatest of the Silversaints and a hero to the people. However, he and Astrid secretly have an affair with each other over the years until she gets pregnant, so both are excommunicated and exiled from the Order.

Three Years Previous 
After eleven years of being exiled, an older and bitter Gabe comes out of retirement. While traveling he meets the Company of the Grail led by Chloe Sauvage, who has found a young urchin named Dior Lanchance who is the only person who knowns where the Holy Grail is to end Daysdeath. Gabe quickly discovers they are being pursued by Danton Voss, one of the Forever King's fledglings, and a mysterious masked vampire of the fifth bloodline called Liathe, both of whom want the Holy Grail. Gabe then discovers the Holy Grail is in fact Dior, as a direct descendant of the Redeemer her blood can destroy vampires and heal injuries. Eventually, Danton catches up to them and kills the Company of the Grail, except for Chole, Gabe, and Dior who escape by jumping off a cliff and into a river. Chloe is lost, but Gabe saves Dior. 

Dior reveals her mother was a whore and when she died, she lived with a group of orphans who survived by stealing. When she and a friend tried to kill a bishop for molesting children, she discovered her powers, was accused as a witch, and sentenced to be tortured before Chloe saved her. Eventually, Gabe reveals to Dior that after being excommunicated, he and Astrid married and had a daughter named Patience. For over a decade they lived happily as a family, until Fabien Voss arrived at their home, where as revenge for Laure he killed Patience and turned Astrid into a vampire. Gabe is travelling to kill Fabian for what he did to his family. Meanwhile, Danton arrives with a dozen vampires to capture Dior, but Liathe arrives and disposes of the other vampires, while Dior destroys Danton with her blood. Eventually they arrive at the Silersaints' monastery where they discover Chloe survived but learn she and the Silversaints intend to kill Dior to end Daysdeath. Gabe tries to stop them, but his former brothers slit his throat and throw him into a chasm, only to be saved by Liathe. She heals Gabe and reveals she is his half-sister Celene Castia who was turned into a vampire by Laure, she promises to answer his questions after he saves Dior. Gabriel kills several of the Silversaints, including his old mentor Greyhands and Chloe, saving Dior in the process.

Present 
The vampire historian, Jean-François, has filled up his tome and must leave for the day. Gabe tries to kill Jean-Francois, but he is saved by his fledgling. Gabe continues to wait in his cell for him to return and tell the rest of his tale, while also thinking about his failures.

Reception 
The book was mostly well received by critics, who praised its exploration of vampire lore and the character of Gabriel. Janelle Janson, in a review for Cemetery Dance Publications, wrote that "Kristoff's visceral writing style, vivid imagery, and knack for the macabre made me swoon."

Critics were divided as to Empire of the Vampire's genre, with Publishers Weekly calling it "dark fantasy" and Janson describing it as "an adult fantasy series with horrific elements." Rob H. Bedford, in a review for SFF World, dubbed the book "epic horror" which depicted the themes and tones of the horror genre on a larger scale more closely associated with epic fantasy. Some reviewers have compared to fantasy novels such as Patrick Rothfuss' The Name of the Wind.

References 

Dark fantasy novels
Vampire novels
Novels by Jay Kristoff
2019 Australian novels
Australian fantasy novels
2021 novels